The Panama national Under-20 football team is the national U-20 team of Panama. The U-20 team is currently coached by Leonardo Pipino. They have made six FIFA U-20 World Cup appearances. Their best results was Round of 16 in 2019.

Technical Staff

 Head Coach: Vacant

Current squad
 The following players were called up for the 2022 CONCACAF U-20 Championship.
 Match dates: 18 June – 3 July 2022
 Caps and goals correct as of: 19 June 2022
 Names in italics denote players who have been capped for the senior team.

Recent call-ups

Historical list of coaches

 2002–2003 Gary Stempel 
 2004–2005 René Mendieta 
 2006–2007 Julio Dely Valdés 
 2008–2009 Cristóbal Maldonado 
 2010–2011 Jorge Dely Valdés 
 2011–2013       José Alfredo Poyatos 
 2013–2014 Javier Wanchope 
 2014–2017 Leonardo Pipino 
 2017–2018 Nelson Gallego 
 2018–2019 Jorge Dely Valdés 
 2019–2020 Julio Dely Valdes 

HonoursMajor competitions CONCACAF Under-20 Championship Runners-up (1):''' 2015

See also

 Panama national football team
 Panama national under-17 football team

References

External links
 

F
Central American national under-20 association football teams